Sergei Nikolaevich Klimovich (born March 8, 1974) is a Russian retired professional ice hockey center who played in one National Hockey League game for the Chicago Blackhawks during the 1996–97 season. In his sole NHL appearance against the Toronto Maple Leafs, on December 9, 1996, he failed to register a point and received two penalty minutes. The rest of his career, which lasted from 1991 to 2011, was mainly spent in the Russian Superleague. Internationally Klimovich played for the Russian national team at the 1993 World Junior Championships.

Career statistics

Regular season and playoffs

International

See also
 List of players who played only one game in the NHL

External links
 

1974 births
Living people
Augsburger Panther players
Chicago Blackhawks draft picks
Chicago Blackhawks players
EC Graz players
HC Belgorod players
HC Donbass players
HC Dynamo Moscow players
HC Sibir Novosibirsk players
HC Spartak Moscow players
Idaho Steelheads (WCHL) players
Indianapolis Ice players
Las Vegas Thunder players
Metallurg Magnitogorsk players
Metallurg Novokuznetsk players
Quebec Rafales players
Russian ice hockey centres
Sportspeople from Novosibirsk